The Saxon Charm is a 1948 American film noir drama film written and directed by Claude Binyon based on the novel of the same name by Frederic Wakeman Sr. and starring Robert Montgomery, Susan Hayward, John Payne and Audrey Totter.

Plot
In a hospital, theatrical producer Matt Saxon is introduced to writer Eric Busch, and ends up offering to produce Eric's new play with financing from millionaire Zack Humber.

Alma Wragge, a singer, is Saxon's girlfriend, but she warns Eric's wife Janet about the producer's notorious "Saxon charm" that coaxes others into doing his bidding, only to end up badly for everyone involved. Sure enough, Saxon's behavior soon ruins Alma's nightclub audition.

It isn't long before Saxon makes a pest of himself, interrupting a beach vacation Eric and Janet take, closing the show after a poor review, then persuading Eric to go off by himself to do rewrites. Saxon loses the financial backing of Humber so he works on his ex-wife, Vivian, to put up the money, not knowing she is broke.

Alma gets a chance to be in a Hollywood movie, but Saxon interferes with that as well. Janet, upset by Eric's absences, begins drinking and threatens to leave him. Eric finally punches Saxon, whose  destructive nature contributes to his ex-wife's suicide but of which he appears to be unaware. Eric and Janet get away from him just in time.

Cast
 Robert Montgomery as Matt Saxon 
 Susan Hayward as Janet Busch 
 John Payne as Eric Busch
 Audrey Totter as Alma Wragge
 Harry Morgan as Hermy (as Harry Morgan)
 Harry von Zell as Zack Humber
 Cara Williams as Dolly Humber
 Chill Wills as Captain Chatham
 Heather Angel as Vivian Saxon
 Ed Agresti as Guest At Mexican Inn (Uncredited)
 Fay Baker as Mrs. Noble (Uncredited)
 John Baragrey as Peter Stanhope (Uncredited)
 Barbara Billingsley as Mrs. Maddox (Uncredited)
 Peter Brocco as Cyril Leatham (Uncredited)
 Kathleen Freeman as Nurse (Uncredited)

See also
 List of American films of 1948

External links
 
 
 
 
 

1948 films
1948 drama films
Films directed by Claude Binyon
American drama films
Universal Pictures films
Films based on American novels
Films scored by Walter Scharf
American black-and-white films
1940s English-language films
1940s American films